Blume  may refer to:

Music

 Blume (band), an Italian band

Surname

 Anna and Bernhard Blume, German artistic photographers
 Astrid Blume (1872-1924), Danish educator and temperance advocate
 Brian Blume (born 1950), a business partner of Gary Gygax in TSR, Inc., producers of the fantasy role-playing game, Dungeons & Dragons
 Carl Ludwig Blume (1796–1862), a German-Dutch botanist, whose botanical abbreviation is Blume
 Clemens Blume (1862–1932), a Jesuit hymnologist
 Clint Blume (1898–1973), a Major League Baseball player
 Danny Blume (born 1960), an American music producer, musician and composer
 David Blume, an American permaculture teacher and entrepreneur
 Fred H. Blume (1875–1971), a Justice of the Wyoming Supreme Court
 Friedrich Blume (1893–1975), a German professor of musicology in Kiel University
 Georg Blume, a correspondent in Beijing, China of the German newspapers "Die Zeit" and "taz"
 Heinrich Blume, German politician
 Holger Blume (born 1973), a German sprinter
 Joaquín Blume (1933–1959), a Spanish gymnast
 John Blume (1909–2002), an American structural engineer 
 Judy Blume (born 1938), an American author
 Lawrence E. Blume, an American professor of economics
 Lesley M. M. Blume, an author, journalist, columnist and cultural observer based in New York City
 Marc Blume (born 1973), a German sprinter
 Marco Blume, a German professional Magic: The Gathering player
 Markus Blume (born 1975), a German politician
 Pernille Blume (born 1994), a Danish swimmer and Olympic gold medalist
 Peter Blume (1906–1992), an American painter and sculptor
 Ray Blume (born 1958), a retired American basketball player
 Renate Blume (born 1944), a German actress
 Ricardo Blume (born 1933), a Peruvian actor and theater director
 Robert Blume (1868–1937), an American sailor serving in the United States Navy during the Spanish–American War who received the Medal of Honor for his actions
 Thaïs Blume (born 1984), Spanish actress
 Veronica Blume (born 1977), a Spanish fashion model and actress
 Walter Blume (disambiguation)

Fictional 

 Blume (Organization), a fictional organization, which appears in Watch Dogs, Watch Dogs 2, and Watch Dogs: Legion.

See also 
 Blume Bl.502, a family of four-seat light aircraft designed in West Germany by Dr Walter Blume in the late 1950s
 Blume High School, a historic building in downtown Wapakoneta, Ohio, United States
 Blume in Love, a 1973 film written and directed by Paul Mazursky
 Desert Blume, Alberta, a hamlet in Canada
 Blum (disambiguation)
 Bloom (disambiguation)
 Bluma (disambiguation)

Occupational surnames